Daan Huiskamp (born 10 November 1985) is a Dutch footballer who plays as a goalkeeper for DVS '33.

Career
He first played in several youth clubs, first Eerbekse Boys, second Vitesse and lastly FC Utrecht. He entered the professional level in the 2005–06 season and started with FC Utrecht for a year. He was later sold to another club, AGOVV.

References

1985 births
Living people
People from Brummen
Dutch footballers
AGOVV Apeldoorn players
FC Utrecht players
SV Spakenburg players
Derde Divisie players
Eerste Divisie players
Association football goalkeepers
DVS '33 players
Footballers from Gelderland
SC Genemuiden players